Beautiful Agony is a paid-subscription erotic website featuring head shots of user-submitted videos showing the participant having orgasms, without providing any visual description of what technique is being used or revealing anything below the neck and upper chest. Men and women are featured on the site.

History 
In 2003 Richard Lawrence and Lauren Olney created the initial video series. In 2004 beautifulagony.com was established as a commercial website. The site is owned and operated by Feck Pty Ltd in Melbourne.

Description 
The website is subscription-based. It does not display advertising. Users post videos of themselves (framed from the shoulders up) having a sexual orgasm and can share their sexual experience in a description area. Users of Beautiful Agony are nicknamed Agonees. Videos that do not look natural (too much makeup for example) are not accepted by the website's moderators.

The company that owns the website, Feck, also operates the website I Shot Myself and the Australian erotic art show Feck:Art.

In popular culture
The band The Sun used Beautiful Agony's clips to make the music video for the song "Romantic Death". A fan-made video also used clips from the site for The Joy Formidable's Austere. Images of Beautiful Agony are used by the NEMO Science Museum in Amsterdam in their exhibition Teen Facts about puberty.

Video clips of the website were also part of exhibitions at the Museum of Sex in New-York and at the Hollywood Erotic Museum. The short film Anatomy: Face produced by Adele Wilkes and distributed by ABC Australia in 2011, focused on the users of Beautiful Agony.

Awards 
 2009: Best Adult Website at the Australian Adult Industry Awards

See also
 Blow Job (1963) – Warhol film
 Eating Too Fast (1966) – Warhol film
 Erotic art
 Erotic photography

Notes

External links

Australian erotica and pornography websites
Internet properties established in 2004